This is a list of organizations involved in the United States abortion-rights movement (also called the pro-choice movement). The movement consists of a variety of organizations, with no single centralized decision-making body.

National organizations

Abortion providers
 Planned Parenthood, the largest provider of reproductive health services in the US, including abortions

Political organizations
 Democratic Party, one of America's two major political parties, supports liberal policies, including abortion access.
 EMILY's List, a political action committee (PAC) that aims to help elect Democratic female candidates in favor of abortion rights to office
 Freedom Socialist Party, a socialist feminist party and defender of free abortion on demand, no forced sterilization, gender-affirming health care and bodily autonomy for all.
 Libertarian Party, America’s 3rd Largest Party that promotes civil liberties and limited government, which includes opposition to government prohibition on Abortion.
 Green Party of the United States, promotes green politics, including support for abortion and contraception on demand.
 Peace and Freedom Party, a left-wing party supportive of environmentalism, aboriginal rights, rights to sexuality, government-funded health care, a woman's right to an abortion, public education, subsidized housing, and a socialist-run economy.
 Radical Women a fighting organization for women's freedom, leadership of the most oppressed, an end to transphobia and racism, and a socialist feminist future.
 Republicans for Choice, a PAC consisting of Republican Party members who support abortion rights
 The Wish List, a PAC aiming to elect Republican female candidates in favor of abortion rights to office
 Democratic Socialists of America, promotes socialist politics by advocating for various social justice issues.
 Party for Socialism and Liberation, a communist party working in the United States to liberate working-class individuals.
 Socialist Alternative, promotes a multi-gender, multi-race working class party focusing on economic issues affecting the working-class, social issues, political issues.

Professional associations
 American College of Obstetricians and Gynecologists, a professional association of physicians specializing in obstetrics and gynecology
 Feminist Abortion Network, a national consortium of independent, feminist, not-for-profit abortion care providers
 National Abortion Federation, a professional association of abortion providers
 National Coalition of Abortion Providers, a defunct trade association representing independent abortion providers

Religious organizations
 Catholics for Choice, a pro-choice Catholic advocacy group
 Clergy Consultation Service on Abortion, a defunct interfaith group of clergy that counseled and referred people for safe abortions before Roe v. Wade
 Joy of Satan Ministries, a polytheistic religion which believes Lillith to be a goddess of women's rights and decisions
 Methodist Federation for Social Action, a network of United Methodist Church clergy and laity working on social justice issues
 Religious Coalition for Reproductive Choice, an interfaith abortion rights organization founded in 1973 after Roe v. Wade
 United Methodist Women, the only official organization for women within the United Methodist Church
 The Satanic Temple, a non theistic religion campaigning for reproductive rights

Other organizations
 African-American Women for Reproductive Freedom, a group developed as a way for African American women to show support for Roe v. Wade
 American Civil Liberties Union (ACLU)
 Ayn Rand Institute, a think tank that supports a woman's right to choose abortion
 Center for Reproductive Rights, a global legal advocacy organization that seeks to advance reproductive rights
 Guttmacher Institute, a research organization on sexual and reproductive health and rights
 I'm Not Sorry.net, a defunct website that collected stories concerning women's positive abortion experiences
 Ipas, an international, non-governmental organization that has the goal of increasing access to safe abortions and contraception
 Legal Alliance for Reproductive Rights, a coalition of United States law firms offering free legal services to people seeking and providing abortions
 NARAL Pro-Choice America, a 501(c)(4) organization that engages in lobbying, political action, and advocacy efforts to oppose restrictions on abortion and expand access to abortion
 National Mobilization for Reproductive Justice, a coalition of grassroots organizations and unions dedicated to building a coordinated mass defense of full reproductive justice on a platform of intersectional demands.   
 National Network of Abortion Funds, a national organization dedicated to increasing access to abortion for low-income people across the U.S.
 National Organization for Women, feminist organization founded in 1966 which supports abortion rights
 National Partnership for Women & Families, a nonprofit organization working on public policies, education and outreach that focuses on women and families
 Rewire News Group, a daily news publication focused on reproductive and sexual health
 Rise Up 4 Abortion Rights, a for-profit activist coalition that leads demonstrations to bring awareness after the overturning of Roe v. Wade
 Rock for Choice, a series of benefit concerts to allow musicians to support abortion-rights movements in the US and Canada
 SisterSong, a national activist organization dedicated to reproductive justice for women of color
 URGE: Unite for Reproductive & Gender Equity, a reproductive rights and justice non-profit organization (formerly named Choice USA)
 Women's Health Action and Mobilization, a defunct organization founded to protest the decision in Webster v. Reproductive Health Services

State and local organizations
 Chicago Abortion Fund, providing medical referrals and funds to low-income women in need of safe abortion services
 Feminist Women's Health Center, based in Atlanta, Georgia
 Jane Collective, an underground abortion provider based in Chicago
 Maine Women's Lobby, dedicated to legislative action on behalf of women and girls in Maine
 West Coast offensive, a coalition of California, Oregon, and Washington to expand abortion access and refuse to extradite individuals to other states who receive or aide in abortion services.

See also
 List of anti-abortion organizations in the United States

References

 
Organizations